Luperosaurus joloensis, also known commonly as the Jolo flapped-legged gecko and Taylor's wolf gecko, is a species of lizard in the family Gekkonidae. The species is endemic to Jolo in the Philippines.

Habitat
The preferred natural habitat of L. joloensis is forest.

Reproduction
L. joloensis is oviparous.

References

Further reading
Taylor EH (1918). "Reptiles of Sulu Archipelago". Philippine Journal of Science, Section D, General Biology, Ethnology, and Anthropology 13: 233–267 + Plates I–III. (Luperosaurus joloensis, new species, pp. 235–237, text figure 3 + Plate I, figure 8).
Taylor EH (1922). The Lizards of the Philippine Islands. Manila: Government of the Philippine Islands, Department of Agriculture and Natural Resources, Bureau of Science. Publication No. 17. 269 pp. + Plates 1–22. (Luperosaurus joloensis, pp. 88–90, text figure 9 + Plate 2, figure 8).

Luperosaurus
Reptiles of the Philippines
Endemic fauna of the Philippines
Reptiles described in 1918
Taxa named by Edward Harrison Taylor